Duel: Final Round is a 2016 South Korean action comedy film starring Lee Joo-seung, Oh Ji-ho, Lee Jung-jin and Shin Jung-geun, and directed by Shin Jai-ho.

Plot
Choi Poong-ho (Lee Joo-seung) learns martial arts from Elder Hwang (Shin Jung-geun) to avenge his older brother Choi Kang-ho (Lee Jung-jin) who ends up in a coma after a duel with a wealthy businessman Han Jae-hee ( Oh Ji-ho).

Cast
 Lee Joo-seung as Choi Poong-ho
 Oh Ji-ho as Han Jae-hee
 Lee Jung-jin as Choi Kang-ho
 Shin Jung-geun as Elder Hwang 
 Son Eun-seo as So-eun
 Ahn Sol-bin as Jung-ran's colleague
 Kim Jin-yeop as Snatch-thief

References

External links
 

2016 films
South Korean action comedy films
2010s Korean-language films
Films directed by Shin Jai-ho
2016 action comedy films
2010s South Korean films